Charlemagne, le prince à cheval is a 1993 television miniseries about the life of Charlemagne. Based primarily on an intimate contemporary biography written by the courtier Einhard, it consists of 3 episodes and covers the period from the death of Charlemagne's father Pepin the Short in AD 768 to his coronation as the first Holy Roman Emperor on Christmas Day, AD 800. 

There is a minor anachronism regarding Saxon leader Widukind's surrender and conversion to Christianity, which in reality did not occur until AD 807 or 808.

The series was directed by Clive Donner; it was his final project before his death in 2010.

Cast
 , as Charlemagne
 Anny Duperey, as Bertrada of Laon
 Lino Capolicchio, as Pope Leo III
 André Oumansky, as Pepin the Short
 Gilles Gaston-Dreyfus, as Einhard
 Xavier Deluc, as Roland
 Corinne Touzet, as Irène
 Paolo Bonacelli, as Vitale
 Vanni Corbellini, as Ganelon
 Pierre Anais, as Turpin
 Nils Tavernier, as Carloman I
 Anne De Broca, as Gerberga, Queen of the Franks
 Dominic Gould
 Carole Richert, as Himiltrude
 Cris Campion, as Pepin the Hunchback
 Sergio Fantoni, as Pope Adrian I
 Frank Finlay, as Alcuin of York
 Remo Girone, as King Desiderius
 Helmut Griem, as Widukind

See also
 List of historical drama films

External links
 

1993 films
Films based on the Matter of France
Films set in France
Films set in the 8th century
Films set in the 9th century
Films set in the Viking Age
Films set in the Holy Roman Empire
French biographical films
French television films
Television series set in the 8th century
Cultural depictions of Charlemagne
Films directed by Clive Donner
1990s French films